The Glen Choga Lodge is a historic lodge in rural Macon County, North Carolina.  It is located in a clearing on the south side of Little Choga Road (North Carolina Route 1402), in Nantahala National Forest.  The lodge is a large U-shaped two-story log structure with a metal roof.  The Glen Choga Lodge is the only saddle notched Adirondack-style lodge made of Wormy Chesnut Logs known to still exist. It was built in 1934–35, at a time when Little Choga Road was a major route between Franklin and Murphy, North Carolina.  The builders were Alexander Breheurs Steuart and his wife Margaret Willis Hays; they operated the lodge as a summer vacation destination until 1941 and the United States entry into World War II.  It did not reopen for commercial use after the war, and has been converted into a private summer residence.

See also
National Register of Historic Places listings in Macon County, North Carolina

References

Houses on the National Register of Historic Places in North Carolina
Houses completed in 1935
Houses in Macon County, North Carolina
National Register of Historic Places in Macon County, North Carolina